Events from the year 1933 in Colombia.

Incumbents
President: Enrique Olaya Herrera

Events
February 14 - unsuccessful attempt by Peruvian Air Force to bomb Colombian Navy, President Herrera breaks off diplomatic relations
February 15 - Colombian forces attack Peruvian positions at Tarapaca, Amazonas
May 14 - Colombian parliamentary election, 1933
May 24 - end of the Colombia-Peru War
August 27 - opening of Captain Germán Olano Moreno Air Base
establishment of Captain Luis F. Gómez Niño Air Base

Births

Deaths